Anti-corruption or anticorruption is anything that opposes or inhibits corruption.

Organisations

Political parties
 Anti-Corruption Party, a Honduran political party
 The Justice & Anti-Corruption Party, a British political party

Commissions
 Anti-Corruption Commission (disambiguation)
 Anti-Corruption Commission (Bangladesh)
 Anti-Corruption Commission of Myanmar
 Kenya Anti-Corruption Commission
 Malaysian Anti-Corruption Commission
 National Anti-Corruption Commission (Thailand)
 Anti-Corruption Commission of Namibia
 Sierra Leone Anti-corruption Commission

Initiatives
 2011 Indian anti-corruption movement, wide-scale protests throughout India, decrying systemic corruption
 Anti-corruption campaign under Xi Jinping, campaign to combat corruption at all levels of government within China; began in 2012 during the general secretaryship of Xi Jinping
 Russian anti-corruption campaign, coordinated effort by the Russian government to hinder corruption

Other uses
 Anti-Corruption (film) (Lian zheng feng bo), 1975 Hong Kong film directed by Ng See Yuen

See also

 
 International Anti-Corruption Day
 Corruption (disambiguation)
 List of anti-corruption agencies
 Political corruption
 Political dissent
 Whistleblowers